Metanemone is a monotypic genus of flowering plants belonging to the family Ranunculaceae. The only species is Metanemone ranunculoides.

Its native range is Southern Central China.

References

Ranunculaceae
Ranunculaceae genera
Monotypic Ranunculales genera